Franzdanielia is a monotypic moth genus in the family Cossidae. Its sole species, Franzdanielia likiangi, is found in China (Yunnan, Sichuan).

The length of the forewings is 21–24 mm. The forewings have a reticulate pattern and a narrow submarginal band of variable length. The hindwings are uniform grey. Adults are on wing from June to July.

Etymology
The genus is named in honour of Dr. Franz Daniel.

References

Natural History Museum Lepidoptera generic names catalog

Cossinae
Moths of Asia
Monotypic moth genera